Gustya may refer to:
Gustya, a diminutive of the Russian male first name Avgust
Gustya, a diminutive of the Russian female first name Avgusta
Gustya, a diminutive of the Russian male first name Avgustin
Gustya, a diminutive of the Russian female first name Avgustina